The Vuelta a los Valles Mineros was a road bicycle race held annually in Spain from 1965 until 1997.

Winners

References

1965 establishments in Spain
1997 disestablishments in Spain
Recurring sporting events established in 1965
Recurring sporting events disestablished in 1997
Cycle races in Spain
Defunct cycling races in Spain